Toy Hunter  is an American reality documentary television series on the Travel Channel that debuted August 15, 2012. The series document the exploits of toy dealer Jordan Hembrough as he visits collections from some of the most popular cities on the East and West Coasts. In September 2012, Travel Channel announced the series' renewal for a second season, which consists of thirteen episodes. It airs in the United Kingdom and Ireland on Quest, in Australia on Foxtel channel A&E and Fetch channel Travel Channel.

Episodes

Pilot Episode

A pilot for the series, entitled "Toy Hunters: NY Comic Con" aired on 1/15/12. It was a one hour episode. In this pilot, there were some differences from the series that followed. One example is that shop assistant Julia Collier is nowhere to be found. The female assistant is played by Nicky. She assists at the Comic Con in New York City as well, along with a male assistant who is never seen in the series again. Jordan repeatedly refers to the series as "the Toy Hunters".

In this pilot, Jordan travels to Cincinnati and Miami to pick up items for New York City Comic Con. In Cincinnati, he acquires a rare rocket-firing "Boba Fett" prototype, while in Miami, he comes across a Thundercats "Mad Bubbbler" prototype from the designer of the item himself. About half of the footage from this pilot was edited into Episode 13 of Season One, entitled "Comic Con NYC".

This double-length episode, along with every other episode of the series, can be viewed on the Travel Channel website.

Season 1 (2012)

Season 2 (2013)

Season 3 (2014)

Home Media

At this time, only Season One has been released on home media, on the DVD format only. It is available burn-on-demand from Amazon.

External links

References

2010s American reality television series
2012 American television series debuts
Travel Channel original programming